Pushpa Pradhan (born 25 November 1981) is a former field hockey player. She was a member of the India women's national field hockey team. She played with the team when it won the Gold at 2004 Women's Hockey Asia Cup.

Early life 
Pradhan was born in Hesel village in tribal heartland Khunti, roughly 60 kilometres from Ranchi, Jharkhand, on 25 November 1981.

References

External links
Biography at bharatiyahockey.org

1981 births
Living people
Indian female field hockey players
People from Khunti district
Sportswomen from Jharkhand
Field hockey players from Jharkhand
Asian Games medalists in field hockey
Field hockey players at the 2006 Asian Games
21st-century Indian women
21st-century Indian people
Asian Games bronze medalists for India
Medalists at the 2006 Asian Games
Nagpuria people